Karl Wilhelm Feuerbach (30 May 1800 – 12 March 1834) was a German geometer and the son of legal scholar Paul Johann Anselm Ritter von Feuerbach, and the brother of philosopher Ludwig Feuerbach. After receiving his doctorate at age 22, he became a professor of mathematics at the Gymnasium at Erlangen. In 1822 he wrote a small book on mathematics noted mainly for a theorem on the nine-point circle, which is now known as Feuerbach's theorem. In 1827 he introduced homogeneous coordinates, independently of Möbius.

Works
 .  ("Properties of some special points in the plane of a triangle, and various lines and figures determined by these points: an analytic-trigonometric treatment")
Grundriss zu analytischen Untersuchungen der dreyeckigen Pyramide ("Foundations of the analytic theory of the triangular pyramid")

References

External links
 
 
 Feuerbach's Theorem: a Proof
 Karl Wilhelm Feuerbach: Geometer
 

1800 births
1834 deaths
Writers from Jena
People from Saxe-Weimar
German Lutherans
19th-century German mathematicians
Geometers